William Ruger may refer to:

William Ruger (state senator) (died 1843), New York politician
William B. Ruger (1916–2002), American firearms manufacturer
William C. Ruger (1824–1892), Chief Judge of the New York Court of Appeals
William P. Ruger, academic and former nominee for United States Ambassador to Afghanistan